Revi Karunakaran (1931–2003) (referred also as Revi Karuna Karan or Ravi Karunakaran) was a leading coir exporter from Kerala, India and former director of the Industrial Development Bank of India (IDBI).
He was the Chairman and Managing Director of the Karan Group of Companies—the world's largest exporter of coir products—and worked significantly for the modernization of the coir industry of India.
The world-renowned Ravi Karunakaran Memorial Museum (RKK Museum) in Alappuzha, Kerala was established in 2006 by his wife, Betty, based on the private collection accumulated by Karunakaran and his family over several generations.

Personal life 
Revi Karunakaran was born in Alleppey (erstwhile Travancore state, British India) on 22 November 1931 in an aristocratic family. His grand father, Krishnan Muthalaly, was the first Indian to put up a handloom factory to export Coir products, which was a monopoly of European Companies till then.

Karunakaran's father, KC Karunakaran, after graduating from Birmingham University, UK, did his Masters from Heidelberg University, Germany, and later married Margret, a lady from Berlin, Germany. Karunakaran had an elder sister, Leela. Margret (Karunakaran's mother), came from a wealthy German family and brought with her a priceless collection of jewellery, art and artifacts that was more than 100 years old.

Karunakaran, after completing his secondary school education from Surrey, UK, studied high school at Lausanne, Switzerland. Later, he graduated with a degree in Business Administration from Babson College, MA, USA. Karunakaran was a polyglot and fluent in several languages such as German, French, English, Italian, Spanish, Dutch and Malayalam.

After his father's demise in 1952, Karunakaran took over the leadership of the companies at the young age of twenty.

Karunakaran married Betty in 1957 and they have a daughter Lullu.

Life as entrepreneur 
After his father's demise in 1952, Karunakaran took the reins of the companies at the young age of twenty.
He was the chairman of the Karan group, which includes companies such as Kerala Balers, Alleppey Company and William Goodacre & Sons , all leading coir export houses.

For maintaining and expanding the business he travelled across the globe often. He represented India in various International forums like FAO, International Trade Centre, UNCTAD etc. and had participated as an effective member in several trade delegations sponsored by the Government of India. He also served FAO for three years as a consultant on hard fibers and had participated in the Tariff Negotiations with the EEC countries.

Karunakaran, who dedicated his life for the modernization of the coir industry, was the Chairman and Managing Director of the Karan Group of Companies—the largest exporter of Coir products—and served as a Director of many reputed companies. He received "Lifetime Achievement Award" from Coir Board, Government of India, in 2001 for the outstanding services he rendered to the Coir Industry.

Other activities and interests 
Karunakaran joined Rotary International at the age of 20. At the age  of 24, he became the President of the club—the youngest rotary club president in the world. Later on he became the Rotary Governor, also at a young age. Karunakaran had been a major donor to the Rotary Foundation. He had also been a Freemason from the age of 21 and a recipient of the 50 year Gold Jewel.

Karunakaran was a great philanthropist and used to make generous contributions for worthy causes.

Death 
Following a brief illness, Karunakaran passed away on 25 November 2003. He is survived by his wife Betty  and daughter Lullu . He passed away at a private hospital in Ernakulam, at 4 a.m. His body was cremated on the premises of Santhi Bhavan, his home at Alappuzha at about 4 p.m. on the same day.

Ravi Karunakaran Memorial Museum 
In 2003, Betty Karan built Revi Karuna Karan memorial museum at Alappuzha in memory of her loving husband. This is now a renowned, privately owned museum holding one of the largest private collections of Swarovski crystals in the world along with porcelain, jade, ivory and Tanjore paintings.

The family of Karunakarans have been avid collectors of fine art and artefacts since at least three generations. The collection was originally maintained strictly within their private domain. However, after Karunakaran's demise, Betty decided to open the collection to the public, as a befitting tribute  to the memory of their most beloved husband and loving father. Lalichan Zachariah, an architect from Ernakulam, helped Betty design the museum. The museum was inaugurated on 22 November 2006 by the former Meghalaya governor, Sri. M.M. Jacob.

The RKK museum is considered by many as a modern architectural marvel of Kerala produced in recent times. The museum has an area of 28,000 sqft and the construction was completed in about three year. A unique feature of the museum is that visitors can see and experience the four major religions of India—Hinduism, Christianity, Islam, and Buddhism—represented with equal prominence on the murals, ivory collection, Kerala room and the items displayed in the old wing.

The third phase of the museum was inaugurated on 22 November 2015 by Her Excellency Chandrika Bandaranaike Kumaratunga.
Most of the pieces displayed  in the museum come with a certificate of authentication, personally certified by Betty.

References 

1931 births
2003 deaths
Businesspeople from Alappuzha
Businesspeople from Kerala